USS Benton County (LST-263) was an  built for the United States Navy during World War II. Named for nine counties of the United States, she was the only U.S. Naval vessel to bear the name.

LST-263 was laid down on 7 September 1942 at Ambridge, Pennsylvania by the American Bridge Company; launched on 27 February 1943; sponsored by Mrs. Charles G. Baumgartner; and commissioned on 30 June 1943.

Service history
During World War II, LST-263 was assigned to the European Theater and participated in Convoy UGS-37 in April 1944 and the invasion of southern France in August and September 1944. She was decommissioned on 29 May 1946 and assigned to the Atlantic Reserve Fleet. On 1 July 1955 the ship was redesignated USS Benton County (LST-263); she was struck from the Naval Vessel Register on 1 November 1958. Her final fate is unknown.
 
LST-263 earned two battle stars for World War II service.

References

 
 

Specific

LST-1-class tank landing ships of the United States Navy
Ships built in Ambridge, Pennsylvania
1943 ships
World War II amphibious warfare vessels of the United States